Riverside is a historic property in Fort Benning, Georgia.  The residence has been home to Fort Benning's commandants. It was completed in 1909 . The house includes a kitchen moved to its present location on logs. Riverside was added to the National Register of Historic Places on May 27, 1971. It is located at 100 Vibbert Avenue.

See also
National Register of Historic Places listings in Chattahoochee County, Georgia

References

External links
 Riverside historical marker

Houses on the National Register of Historic Places in Georgia (U.S. state)
Houses completed in 1909
Houses in Chattahoochee County, Georgia
National Register of Historic Places in Chattahoochee County, Georgia